Castilleja ecuadorensis is a species of plant in the family Orobanchaceae. It is endemic to Ecuador.

References

ecuadorensis
Endemic flora of Ecuador
Vulnerable plants
Taxonomy articles created by Polbot
Plants described in 1984